The Northern Suburbs Crematorium, officially Northern Suburbs Memorial Gardens and Crematorium, is a crematorium in North Ryde, New South Wales, a suburb of Sydney, Australia. It was officially opened on 28 October 1933, and the first cremation took place on 30 October 1933.

Northern Suburbs Crematorium was the second crematorium in New South Wales. It was designed by Frank I'Anson Bloomfield (1879–1949), who was cremated there, and also designed NSW and Sydney's first crematorium at Rookwood Cemetery. Bloomfield designed both places with a view to an authentic "florentine" feel.  The grounds feature Art Deco statues, Royal Doulton tiles, classic iron work and other period features. The Memorial Gardens is a heritage listed site and often features in historical tours of Sydney and the North Shore.

The most notable interments include two Prime Ministers of Australia, Chris Watson and Joseph Cook, one Premier of New South Wales and later Governor-General of Australia, Sir William McKell, and the poet and author of Waltzing Matilda, Banjo Paterson.
And one of Australia's most famous country singers, Slim Dusty.
In 2012 a new Function Centre was opened by the Governor of New South Wales, Professor Marie Bashir.

Notable interments 
The cremated remains of notable persons located at Northern Suburbs Crematorium include:
 Jack Baddeley, 2nd Deputy Premier of New South Wales 
 Sir Garfield Barwick, 7th Chief Justice of Australia and politician 
 Harry Scott Bennett, radical
 Sir Nigel Bowen, Australian Attorney-General, Minister for Foreign Affairs and Chief Justice of the Federal Court of Australia
 Sir Joseph Cook, 6th Prime Minister of Australia  
 Dame Mary Cook, Spouse of the Prime Minister of Australia 
 Sir Talbot Duckmanton, former General Manager of Australian Broadcasting Corporation (ABC)
 Pat Hills, 6th Deputy Premier of New South Wales and 69th Lord Mayor of Sydney   
 Sir Samuel Hordern, businessman and namesake of the Hordern Pavilion
 Stuart Inder, journalist
 Frederick Kneeshaw, politician
 Sir William McKell, 12th Governor General of Australia and 27th Premier of New South Wales 
 Sir Bill Northam, Olympic yachtsman and businessman 
 Lt. Gen. Sir John Northcott, 30th Governor of New South Wales 
 Lady Jean Page, second wife of Prime Minister Sir Earle Page  
 Banjo Paterson, poet
 Sir William Pettingell, businessman
 Maj. Gen Sir Charles Rosenthal, soldier and politician
 Sir Percy Spender, politician
 Sir Vernon Treatt, 17th Leader of the Opposition of New South Wales
 Sir Gordon Wallace, 1st President of the New South Wales Court of Appeal
 Sir Edward Warren, politician
 Chris Watson, 3rd Prime Minister of Australia
 Reginald Weaver, 16th Leader of the Opposition of New South Wales
 Lt. Gen. Sir Eric Woodward, 31st Governor of New South Wales 
 Sir William Yeo, soldier
 Ada Baker, soprano and singing teacher

Notable cremations

Cremations of notable people at the Northern Suburbs Crematorium include:
 Sid Barnes, crickete
 Sir Thomas Bavin, Premier of New South Wales
 Captain George Cartwright, A.I.F., VC recipient, World War I
 Captain Frank Chaffey, soldier and New South Wales politician
 V. Gordon Childe, archaeologist and philologist
 Charmian Clift, novelist
 Slim Dusty, country singer
 Air Commodore Sir Hughie Edwards, Royal Air Force VC recipient World War II and Governor of Western Australia – ashes buried Karrakatta Cemetery, Perth, Western Australia
 Sergeant Arthur Evans, Lincolnshire Regiment VC recipient World War I – ashes buried Lytham St Annes, England
 May Gibbs, author
 Michael Hutchence, INXS lead singer
 Alison Kerr, Lady Kerr, first wife of Sir John Kerr
 Banjo Paterson, poet
 Mervyn Victor Richardson, Victa lawnmower inventor
 Lindsay Gordon Scott, architect
  Sir James Joynton Smith, Lord Mayor of Sydney
 Corporal Arthur Sullivan, A.I.F. VC recipient, Russian Civil War – previously cremated Golders Green Crematorium, London, ashes rest near Tree 267A, North section.
 E. J. Tait, theatre entrepreneur
 Arkie Whiteley, actress

Commemorated by the Commonwealth War Graves Commission are 64 Commonwealth service personnel and a Dutch merchant seaman who were cremated here during World War II.

References

External links
 

Crematoria in Australia
Anglican Diocese of Sydney
1933 establishments in Australia
Cemeteries in Sydney